Tylothais inhacaensis is a species of sea snail, a marine gastropod mollusk, in the family Muricidae, the murex snails or rock snails.

Distribution
This species occurs in Mozambique.

References

inhacaensis
Gastropods described in 2017